In mathematics, an internal bialgebroid is a structure which generalizes the notion of an associative bialgebroid to the setup where the ambient symmetric monoidal category of vector spaces is replaced by any abstract symmetric monoidal category (C, I,s) admitting coequalizers commuting with the monoidal product . The coequalizers are needed to introduce the tensor product  of (internal) bimodules over the base monoid; this tensor product is consequently (a part of) a monoidal structure on the category of -bimodules. In the axiomatics,  appears to be an -bimodule in a specific way.

Some important examples are analogues of associative bialgebroids in the situations involving completed tensor products.

See also
Bialgebra

References

Bialgebras